William (Bill) Colvig (March 13, 1917 – March 1, 2000) was an electrician and amateur musician who was the partner for 33 years of composer Lou Harrison, whom he met in San Francisco in 1967. Colvig helped construct the American gamelan used in works such as the puppet opera Young Caeser [sic] (1971), La Koro Sutro (1972), and the Suite for Violin and American Gamelan (1974).

Films
1986 – Lou Harrison: "cherish, conserve, consider, create." Directed by Eric Marin.
1995 – Musical Outsiders: An American Legacy – Harry Partch, Lou Harrison, and Terry Riley. Directed by Michael Blackwood.

Personal life
Colvig lived for many years with Lou Harrison in Aptos, California. He and Harrison purchased land in Joshua Tree, California, where they designed and built the Harrison House Retreat, a straw bale house.

See also
Ingolf Dahl
West Coast School

Notes

Sources
Brett Campbell, "Hail Caesar! Harrison Opera's Epic Quest", accessed July 7, 2010
Maria Cizmic, "Composing the Pacific", accessed July 7, 2010
Patrick Gardner, "Lou Harrison: La Koro Sutro", Providence Singers, accessed July 7, 2010
Anthony Linick, The Lives of Ingolf Dahl (Bloomington, IN: AuthorHouse, 2008)

External links
NewMusicBox News: April 2000 John Luther Adams Remembers William Colvig
Article about William Colvig

1917 births
2000 deaths
Colvig William
American musical instrument makers
Contemporary classical music performers
American LGBT musicians
20th-century classical musicians
20th-century American musicians
20th-century American male musicians
20th-century American LGBT people